Robert Henry Keys (December 18, 1943 – December 2, 2014) was an American saxophonist who performed as a member of several horn sections of the 1970s. He appears on albums by the Rolling Stones, Lynyrd Skynyrd, Harry Nilsson, Delaney & Bonnie and Friends, George Harrison, John Lennon, Eric Clapton, Joe Cocker and other prominent musicians. Keys played on hundreds of recordings and was a touring musician from 1956 until his death in 2014.

Early life and start 
Bobby Keys was born at Lubbock Army Airfield near Slaton, Texas, where his father, Bill Keys, was in the U.S. Army Air Corps. His mother, Lucy Keys, was 16 when she gave birth to Robert Henry (Bobby), her first child. By 1946, Bill Keys got a job for the Santa Fe Railroad in Belen, New Mexico. The family moved to Belen, but young Robert stayed with his grandparents in Slaton, Texas, an arrangement he was quite happy with. Bill and Lucy would have three more children, Gary and twins Debbie and Daryl. Lucy Keys Brubaker went on to become a state senator in New Mexico.

Keys started touring at age fifteen with fellow Texan Buddy Knox.

Career
Keys met the Rolling Stones at the San Antonio Teen Fair while sharing a bill with the group as a member of Bobby Vee's band in 1964. He is best known for his impressive resume as a musician (most notably the saxophone solo on the 1971 Rolling Stones hit "Brown Sugar") and his friendship with Keith Richards. They were born on the same day. Notably, Keys and Richards threw a television set from the 10th floor of the Continental Hyatt House in West Hollywood, California during the group's 1972 American tour, as seen in the Stones' unreleased 1972 concert movie Cocksucker Blues. After renewing his acquaintance with the band via Gram Parsons, a mutual friend, Keys made his debut with The Rolling Stones on the Let It Bleed track "Live with Me" in 1969. In addition to "Brown Sugar," he was prominently featured on such early 1970s Stones songs as "Can't You Hear Me Knocking," "Rip This Joint" and "Sweet Virginia."

Keys and Mick Jagger also became close in the early 1970s, with Keys serving as best man at Jagger's wedding. Together with Jim Price on trumpet, Keys toured with the Stones from 1970 to 1973. Along with trumpeter Steve Madaio and fellow saxophonist Trevor Lawrence, Keys continued as a touring member for the first half of the 1973 European tour before leaving in Frankfurt, Germany on September 30. According to legend, Keys was abruptly dismissed by an incensed Jagger after filling a bathtub with Dom Perignon champagne (resulting in a debt to the band that significantly exceeded his entire salary for the tour) and drinking most of it. Although Keys did not dispute the veracity of the incident, he subsequently maintained in his memoir that he left the tour of his own volition to curtail his heroin addiction for the sake of his family. As a result of his strained relationship with Jagger, Keys only guested on some shows of the 1975 and 1978 American tours, missing the 1976 European tour completely.

Richards recalled Keys overcoming Jagger's objections to returning to the band:

Keys performed on only four tracks on the 1981 tour, on which Ernie Watts was the saxophonist. Keys was reinstated as the band's main touring saxophonist on the 1982 European Tour, together with Gene Barge. Keys played with the Stones on all subsequent tours up to his death.

Prior to touring with the Stones, Keys played with Delaney & Bonnie and Friends with Eric Clapton and George Harrison in 1969. In particular, during the year 1970 he gave a series of notable performances. Keys started the year working on Clapton's first solo LP. With Leon Russell, he supported Joe Cocker on the 48-city Mad Dogs & Englishmen tour; the live album Mad Dogs & Englishmen was released later in the year, followed by a concert movie in 1971. During the tour, Cocker and the band were accompanied by a largely American entourage, including a choir, friends, wives, children, groupies and a single dog named Canina; the entire group numbered almost 40 people. After work on George Harrison's All Things Must Pass and more Sticky Fingers tracks, he joined the Rolling Stones for their fall 1970 European tour.

From 1973 to 1975, Keys participated in Lennon's "Lost Weekend" in Los Angeles along with Ringo Starr, Harry Nilsson and Keith Moon; while in Los Angeles, he played on Lennon's albums Walls and Bridges (including a notable solo on the #1 American hit "Whatever Gets You thru the Night") and Rock 'n' Roll. Although Keys' voice is heard on the last known recording session between Paul McCartney and Lennon (widely bootlegged as A Toot and a Snore in '74), he could not recall contributing to the session. He also played the solo on Leo Sayer's 1977 international soft rock hit "When I Need You" from the Endless Flight album.

In 1979, Keys was part of a Rolling Stones spin-off band called The New Barbarians (which also included Ronnie Wood & Keith Richards) that played two concerts in Canada and eighteen shows across the United States in April and May 1979.

In 1989, Keys became the musical director for Ronnie Wood's new Miami club, Woody's On the Beach. The first week the club opened Keys booked Jerry Lee Lewis, Fats Domino and the Crickets. In the early 1990s Keys was a resident of Miami and had a band with former Stones guitarist Mick Taylor, Nicky Hopkins, Ivan Neville, former Stephen Stills bassist Calvin "Fuzzy" Samuels and others called Tumbling Dice. Although better known as a session musician, Keys released two albums of his own in the 1970s: a self-titled instrumental album on Warner Bros. Records that featured Ringo Starr, George Harrison and Eric Clapton in 1972; and Gimme the Key on Ringo Starr's record label Ring O'Records in 1975.

Keys appeared on December 16, 2011, with the Athens, Georgia-based band Bloodkin in their "Exile on Lumpkin Street" show at the Georgia Theater, which re-opened in August 2011 in its remodeled and enlarged space after the building had been gutted by fire in June 2009. Besides performing some of their own music, Bloodkin performed with Keys on numerous hits from three of the biggest Stones' albums on which Keys had performed, Let It Bleed, Sticky Fingers, and Exile on Main St.

In 2013 he played with the Rolling Stones at their Glastonbury Festival debut, headlining on Saturday, June 29. Keys played on their 14 On Fire tour with Roskilde Festival in Denmark being his last gig for the Stones.

Personal life and death
Keys was married to Holly Keys.  Bobby's children are Amber Keys, Huck Keys, Jesse Keys and his step-son Randy Kaune.

Keys died of liver cancer in hospice care at his home in Franklin, Tennessee, on December 2, 2014, sixteen days before his 71st birthday.

Selected discography
An eponymous solo album was released by Warner Bros. in 1972. He also appears on:
The Rolling Stones: Let It Bleed, Sticky Fingers, Let It Rock EP (UK), Exile on Main St., Goats Head Soup, Emotional Rescue, Flashpoint, Stripped, No Security, Shine a Light, Live Licks, Sweet Summer Sun
Joe Cocker: Mad Dogs & Englishmen
George Harrison: All Things Must Pass
John Lennon: Some Time in New York City, Walls and Bridges, Rock 'n' Roll
Keith Richards: Talk Is Cheap, Live at the Hollywood Palladium
Ringo Starr: Ringo, Goodnight Vienna
Ronnie Wood: 1234, Gimme Some Neck, Mahoney's Last Stand
B.B. King: B.B. King in London
Audience: Lunch
Barbra Streisand: Barbra Joan Streisand
Carly Simon: No Secrets, Hotcakes
Chuck Berry: Hail! Hail! Rock 'n' Roll
Delaney, Bonnie & Friends: The Original Delaney & Bonnie: Accept No Substitute, On Tour with Eric Clapton
Donovan: Cosmic Wheels
Dr. John: The Sun, Moon & Herbs
Eric Clapton: Eric Clapton
Faces: Long Player
Harry Nilsson: Nilsson Schmilsson, Son of Schmilsson, Pussy Cats, Duit on Mon Dei
Warren Zevon: Warren Zevon
Humble Pie: Rock On
Joe Ely: Lord of the Highway, "Joe Ely Live, Chicago 1987"
John Hiatt: Beneath This Gruff Exterior
John Martyn: Inside Out
Kate & Anna McGarrigle: Kate & Anna McGarrigle
Keith Moon: Two Sides of the Moon
Leo Sayer: Endless Flight
Lynyrd Skynyrd: Second Helping
John Lennon and Paul McCartney: A Toot and a Snore in '74
John Lennon: Whatever Gets You thru the Night
Marvin Gaye: Let's Get It On (deluxe edition)
Sheryl Crow: The Globe Sessions
Yoko Ono: Fly
Jim Carroll: Catholic Boy
Graham Nash: Songs for Beginners
Carl Carlton & The Songdogs: Love and Respect, Cahoots and Roots

References

1943 births
2014 deaths
20th-century American musicians
21st-century American musicians
American rock saxophonists
American male saxophonists
American session musicians
Delaney & Bonnie & Friends members
Musicians from Texas
People from Slaton, Texas
Plastic Ono Band members
Deaths from cirrhosis
Alcohol-related deaths in Tennessee
Deaths from liver cancer
Deaths from cancer in Tennessee
Lubbock High School alumni